Emily Montague Mulkin Bishop (Mulkin; November 3, 1858 – November 22, 1916) was an American Delsartean lecturer and instructor in dress, expression and physical culture. She was recognized as one of the noted editors and authors on this subject in the United States, commonly using the name Emily M. Bishop. Bishop was also a pioneer suffragist. Among her publications are included Americanized Delsarte Culture (1892), Self-expression and Health: Americanized Delsarte Culture (1895), Interpretive Forms of Literature (1903), Seventy Years Young, or The Unhabitual Way (1907), Daily Ways to Health (1910), and The Road to "Seventy Years Young": Or, The Unhabitual Way (1916).

Early life and education
Emily Montague Mulkin was born in Forestville, Chautauqua County, New York, November 3, 1858. Her parents were Asa L. Mulkins (1827-1893) and Ann E. (De Witt) Mulkins (1827-1861). 

She was educated in the Forestville High School.

Career

After leaving school, she taught four years, serving as assistant principal of the union school in Silver Creek, New York. She afterwards gave several years to the study of Delsarte work in various cities. 

After marriage, she moved to Black Hills, South Dakota. Mrs. Bishop was elected superintendent of public schools in Rapid City, South Dakota, being the first woman thus honored in the Dakota Territory. 

In 1885, she was invited to establish a Delsarte department in the Chautauqua School of Physical Education, in the Chautauqua Assembly, New York. She has had charge of that department for four seasons, and it steadily grew in popularity. In 1891, it was the largest single department in the Assembly. From the Chautauqua work grew a large public work in lecturing and teaching. Her lectures were on literature, physical culture and she gave public readings at Pratt Institute, Brooklyn; Drexel Institute, Philadelphia; Mechanics Institute, Rochester, New York; and in principle cities of the U.S. and Canada. She was the originator and interpreter of the policical readings known as "Dramatic Scenes from the United States Senate", through which she gained national fame.

She wrote a number of articles for various magazines and published several books including, Americanized Delsarte Culture.

Personal life
In 1884, she married Coleman E. Bishop, editor of the Judge, New York. In addition to the Dakota Territory, Bishop lived in New York City, and in Washington, D.C. 

Just before her illness, Bishop became connected with the Women's Democratic League and spoke at meetings on behalf of President Wilson. She died November 22, 1916 at New York Hospital, in New York City, age 59.

Selected works
 Americanized Delsarte Culture, 1892
 Self-expression and Health: Americanized Delsarte Culture, 1895
 Interpretive Forms of Literature, 1903
 Seventy Years Young, or The Unhabitual Way, 1907
 Daily Ways to Health, 1910
 The Road to "Seventy Years Young": Or, The Unhabitual Way, 1916

References

Attribution

External links
 
 

1858 births
1916 deaths
People from Forestville, New York
Lecturers
19th-century American non-fiction writers
20th-century American non-fiction writers
19th-century American women writers
20th-century American women writers
Dakota Territory officials
Wikipedia articles incorporating text from A Woman of the Century